Harry Allan Stewart (July 11, 1892 – February 22, 1970) was a dentist and politician in Ontario, Canada. He represented Kingston in the Legislative Assembly of Ontario from 1943 to 1951 as a Progressive Conservative.

The son of Thomas Henry Stewart and Elizabeth Allan, both natives of Scotland, he was born in Ash, Ontario and was educated in Kingston and at the University of Toronto. In 1916, Stewart married Hazel Victoria Greenwood. He served in the Canadian Army Dental Corps from 1916 to 1921. He was a member of Kingston city council from 1932 to 1936 and served as mayor of Kingston from 1938 to 1943. Stewart was also chair of the local Board of Education.

He was an older brother of Boston Bruins goaltender Charles Stewart.

References

External links

1892 births
1970 deaths
Mayors of Kingston, Ontario
Progressive Conservative Party of Ontario MPPs